Georgiana County was one of the original Nineteen Counties in New South Wales and is now one of the 141 Cadastral divisions of New South Wales. It lies in the area about halfway between Bathurst and Goulburn. The Lachlan River is the western boundary, with the Crookwell River the southern boundary. It includes Bigga, and the area surrounding the Abercrombie River. It was part of the Electoral district of King and Georgiana from 1856 to 1859.

Georgiana County was named in honour of Georgiana Cavendish, Duchess of Devonshire (1757-1806).

Parishes within this county
A full list of parishes found within this county; their current LGA and mapping coordinates to the approximate centre of each location is as follows:

References

Counties of New South Wales